General elections were held in the Faroe Islands on 18 July 1906. The result was a victory for the Union Party, which won 12 of the 20 seats in the Løgting.

Results

References

Elections in the Faroe Islands
Faroe Islands
1906 in the Faroe Islands
July 1906 events
Election and referendum articles with incomplete results